Dadafon (established in 1995 in Trondheim, Norway) was a Norwegian experimental jazz band, originally called Coloured Moods (name changed in 2000), initiated by drummer Martin Smidt, and including Kristin Asbjørnsen (vocals), Carl Haakon Waadeland (drums), Jostein Ansnes and Bjørn Ole Solberg. The band had African music influences.

Lead singer Kristin Asbjørnsen brought an authority to their sound that many female rock singers may shy away from as she not only has the range to lead such a strong band of musicians, but also the vocal power to take their songs to new heights. They performed songs in Norwegian and English. Dadafon and Kristin Asbjønsen, performed most of the songs on the Factotum sound track, like slow day.

Band members

Present members 
Kristin Asbjørnsen - vocals (1995- )
Jostein Ansnes - guitar (1995- )
Bjørn Ole Solberg - saxophone (1995- )
Øyvind Engen - cello (2004- )
Eirik Øien - bass (2002- )
Martin Viktor Langlie - drums (2004- )

Past members 
Martin Smidt - drums, percussion & xylophone (1995-2002)
Carl Haakon Waadeland - drums (1995-2002)
Kenneth Kapstad - drums (2002–04)

Discography
1998: Coloured Moods (Rim Records)
2001: And I Can't Stand Still (Rim Records)
2002: Visitor (Via Music)
2004: Harbour (Universal Spain)
2005: Lost Love Chords (EmArcy Records)
2006: Factotum (Milan), music for the film by Bent Hammer

References

External links
 [ Allmusic.com]
 Dadafon Biography on Last.fm
 Dadafon Biography on Emarcy.com

Norwegian experimental musical groups
Musical groups established in 1995
1995 establishments in Norway
Musical groups from Trondheim

fr:Kristin Asbjørnsen#Dadafon